Ruthenium(III) iodide is a chemical compound containing ruthenium and iodine with the formula . It is a black solid.

Preparation 
Ruthenium(III) iodide can be prepared in several ways.

The reaction of ruthenium tetroxide with aqueous hydroiodic acid:

The thermal decomposition of pentaammineruthenium(III) iodide:

The salt metathesis reaction of hydrated ruthenium(III) chloride with potassium iodide in aqueous solution:

Direct combination of the elements has been reported to succeed under some conditions (350 °C) but not others (500 °C and 20 atm):

Structure 
Ruthenium(III) iodide adopts an extended structure with octahedral coordination geometry at ruthenium. There is some doubt about the characterisation of ruthenium(III) iodide and it may be an oxohalide or a hydroxyhalide.

References

Ruthenium(III) compounds
Iodides
Platinum group halides